The Bootleg Series Vol. 12: The Cutting Edge 1965–1966 is a compilation album by American singer-songwriter Bob Dylan, released on Legacy Records in November 2015. The tenth installment in the ongoing Bob Dylan Bootleg Series, it comprises recordings from 1965 and 1966, mostly unreleased demos and outtakes from recording sessions for his ground-breaking albums Bringing It All Back Home, Highway 61 Revisited and Blonde on Blonde. The standard set peaked at #41 on the Billboard 200.

Content
Three different versions of the set were released simultaneously: a two-disc 36-track Best of edition in the packaging and format standard to the rest of the series after the first installment; a six-disc 111-track box set Deluxe edition similar in packaging to its counterpart from the previous Bootleg set; and an 18-disc 379-track limited Collector's Edition available exclusively by order from Dylan's official website, which also came with nine mono vinyl singles reproducing ones released around the world by Columbia Records during this era. Only 5000 copies of this edition were produced.

The Collector's Edition was unique as it included "...every note recorded during the 1965–1966 sessions, every alternate take and alternate lyric" on 17 discs, with an 18th disc of hotel room recordings of Dylan with Joan Baez or Robbie Robertson. All tracks on the standard two-disc Best of edition are also included in the Deluxe edition.

Purchasers of the Collector's Edition were also offered 208 live recordings from 1965 as a free digital download.

Title
The title of the set, “The Cutting Edge,” a hackneyed expression about being at the forefront of a movement, is used ironically by Dylan in his 2004 memoir Chronicles: Volume One when writing about the music scene of the late 1950s and early 1960s. He proleptically describes the era by alluding to the Rock Era that had not yet arrived:

[John Hammond] saw me as someone in the long line of a tradition, the tradition of blues, jazz and folk and not as some newfangled wunderkind on the cutting edge. Not that there was any cutting edge. Things were pretty sleepy on the Americana music scene in the late '50s and early '60s. Popular radio was sort of at a standstill and filled with empty pleasantries. It was years before The Beatles, The Who or The Rolling Stones would breathe new life and excitement into it. 

He also uses it later in chapter 5, "River of Ice" when describing "Pirate Jenny":

I took the song apart and unzipped it -- it was the form, the free verse association, the structure and disregard for the known certainty of melodic patterns to make it seriously matter, give it its cutting edge.

Singles reproductions
Duplicates of the following nine singles are included with the Collector's Edition:

"Subterranean Homesick Blues" b/w "She Belongs to Me" (1965)
"Like a Rolling Stone" b/w "Gates of Eden" (1965)
"Positively 4th Street" b/w "From a Buick 6" (1965)
"Can You Please Crawl Out Your Window?" b/w "Highway 61 Revisited" (1966)
"One of Us Must Know (Sooner or Later)" b/w "Queen Jane Approximately" (1966)
"Rainy Day Women ♯12 & 35" b/w  "Pledging My Time" (1966)
"I Want You" b/w "Just Like Tom Thumb's Blues (live)" (1966)
"Just Like a Woman" b/w "Obviously 5 Believers" (1966)
"Leopard-Skin Pill-Box Hat" b/w "Most Likely You Go Your Way And I'll Go Mine" (1967)

Best of track listing

Deluxe edition track listing

Collector's edition track listing

Personnel
Bob Dylan — vocals, guitar, piano, harmonica
Mike Bloomfield, Al Gorgoni, John Hammond, Jr., Jerry Kennedy, Bruce Langhorne, Charlie McCoy, Wayne Moss, Kenny Rankin, Robbie Robertson — guitars
Joe South — guitar, bass guitar
Paul Griffin — piano, electric piano, organ
Al Kooper — organ, electric piano, celeste
Frank Owens — piano, electric piano
Richard Manuel, Hargus "Pig" Robbins — piano
Garth Hudson — organ
John Sebastian — bass guitar, harmonica
John Boone, Harvey Brooks, Rick Danko, Joseph Macho, Jr., Russ Savakus, Henry Strzelecki — bass guitar
Kenny Buttrey, Bobby Gregg, Levon Helm, Sandy Konikoff, Sam Lay — drums
Joan Baez — vocals, guitar on "Remember Me," "More and More," "Blues Stay Away from Me," "Weary Blues from Waitin'," "Lost Highway," "I'm So Lonesome I Could Cry," "Young But Daily Growing," and "Wild Mountain Thyme"
Angeline Butler — backing vocals on "If You Gotta Go, Go Now"

Charts

Weekly

Year-end

See also
Bringing It All Back Home
Highway 61 Revisited
Blonde on Blonde

References

External links
 BobDylan.com  – Official web site, including lyrics and touring schedule.
 Bob Dylan 1965 and 1966 recording session details on Olof Björner's website.

2015 compilation albums
Bob Dylan compilation albums
Columbia Records compilation albums
Demo albums